Henry Cunningam (7 July 1707 – 9 July 1777) was an Irish Anglican priest in the 18th century.

Cunningham was born in Limerick and educated at Trinity College, Dublin. He held livings at Killuken, Tumna and Creeve. was appointed  Archdeacon of Elphin in 1751. He resigned in 1761 for the Prebendal Stall of Ballintubber in Elphin Cathedral.

References 

Archdeacons of Elphin
Alumni of Trinity College Dublin
Clergy from Limerick (city)
18th-century Irish Anglican priests
1777 deaths
1707 births